Rawdon was a historic township in Hastings County in east-central Ontario, Canada.

It was founded in 1798 and named after Sir Francis Rawdon-Hastings, 1st Marquess of Hastings. In 1858, the village of Stirling was incorporated and so became a separate municipality. In 1997, the village and township were reunited to form the municipality of Stirling-Rawdon, Ontario.

External links 
 A brief history of Rawdon Township and Stirling

Communities in Hastings County
Former township municipalities in Ontario